Bartoszewice refers to the following places in Poland:

 Bartoszewice, Greater Poland Voivodeship
 Bartoszewice, Kuyavian-Pomeranian Voivodeship